Rinfret is a surname. Notable people with the surname include:
People
Édouard Rinfret (1905–1994), Canadian lawyer, politician and judge
Côme Isaïe Rinfret (1847–1911), Canadian physician and politician
Fernand Rinfret (1883–1939), Canadian politician
Maurice Rinfret (1915–1967), Liberal party member of the Canadian House of Commons
Pierre Andrew Rinfret (1924–2006), founder of Rinfret-Boston Associates, economic advisor, Republican Candidate for Governor of New York in 1990
Rémi-Ferdinand Rinfret (1819–1901), physician and political figure in Quebec
Thibaudeau Rinfret, PC (1879–1962), Canadian jurist and Chief Justice of Canada
Places
Rinfret, Quebec, railway junction in Saint-Jérôme, Quebec